These 118 genera belong to the family Mutillidae, velvet ants.

Mutillidae genera

 Acanthophotopsis Schuster, 1958 g
 Acrophotopsis Schuster, 1958 g b
 Allotilla Schuster, 1949 g
 Ancipitotilla Mickel, 1952 g
 Ancistrotilla Brothers, 2012 g
 Andreimyrme Lelej, 1995 g
 Arcuatotilla Nonveiller, 1998 g
 Arnoldtilla Nonveiller, 1996 g
 Artiotilla Invrea, 1950 g
 Ascetotilla Brothers, 1971 g
 Bidecoloratilla Turrisi & Matteini Palmerini g
 Bimaculatilla Turrisi & Matteini Palmerini g
 Bischoffitilla Lelej, 2002 g
 Blakeius Ashmead, 1903 g
 Brahmatilla Lelej, 2005 g
 Ceratophotopsis Schuster, 1949 g
 Chaetotilla Schuster, 1949 g
 Chrestomutilla Brothers, 1971 g
 Cretavus Sharov, 1957 g
 Ctenotilla Bischoff, 1920 g
 Cystomutilla André, 1896 g
 Darditilla Casal, 1965 g
 Dasylabris Radoszkowski, 1885 g
 Dasymutilla Ashmead, 1899 i c g b
 Dentilla Lelej, 1980 g
 Dentotilla  g
 Dilophotopsis Schuster, 1958 g b
 Dolichomutilla Ashmead, 1899 g
 Eotilla Schuster, 1949 g
 Ephucilla Lelej, 1995 g
 Ephusuarezia Casal, 1968 g
 Ephuta Say, 1836 b
 Ephutomma Ashmead, 1899 g
 Ephutomorpha André, 1902 c g
 Frigitilla  g
 Gystomutilla  g
 Hemutilla Lelej, Tu & Chen g
 Hoplocrates Mickel, 1937 g
 Hoplognathoca Suárez, 1962 g
 Hoplomutilla Ashmead, 1899 g
 Horcomutilla Casal, 1962 g
 Karlissaidia Lelej, 2005 g
 Karunaratnea Lelej, 2005 g
 Krombeinella Pate, 1947 g
 Kudakrumia Krombein, 1979 g
 Kurzenkotilla Lelej, 2005 g
 Labidomilla André, 1902 g
 Laminatilla Pitts, 2007 g
 Lehritilla Lelej, 2005 g
 Leucospilomutilla Ashmead, 1903 g
 Liomutilla André, 1907 g
 Lomachaeta Mickel, 1936 g b
 Lophomutilla Mickel, 1952 g
 Lophostigma Mickel, 1952 g
 Lynchiatilla Casal, 1963 g
 Macromyrme Lelej, 1984 g
 Mickelomyrme Lelej, 1995 g
 Mimecomutilla Ashmead, 1903 g
 Myrmilla Wesmael, 1852 g
 Myrmilloides  b
 Myrmosa Latreille, 1796 g
 Nanomutilla Andre, 1900 g
 Nanotopsis Schuster, 1949 g
 Nemka Lelej, 1985 g
 Neotrogaspidia Lelej, 1996 g
 Odontomutilla Ashmead, 1899 g
 Odontophotopsis Viereck, 1903 g b
 Orientidia Lelej, 1996 g
 Orientilla Lelej, 1979 g
 Paglianotilla Lelejan Harten, 2006 g
 Pappognatha Mickel, 1939 g
 Paramyrmosa de Saussure, 1880 g
 Pertyella Mickel, 1952 g
 Petersenidia Lelej, 1992 g
 Pherotilla  g
 Photomorphus (Photomorphina) archboldi Manley & Deyrup, 1987 g b
 Photopsis Blake, 1886 g
 Physetopoda Schuster, 1949 g
 Platymyrmilla Andre, 1900 g
 Promecidia Lelej, 1996 g
 Promecilla André, 1902 g
 Protomutilla Bischoff, 1916 g
 Protophotopsis Schuster, 1947 g b
 Prototilla Schuster, 1949 g
 Pseudomethoca Ashmead, 1896 g b
 Pseudomyrmosa Suárez, 1980 g
 Pseudophotopsis Andre, 1896 g
 Radoszkowskitilla Lelej, 2005 g
 Radoszkowskius Ashmead, 1903 g
 Rasnitsynitilla Lelejan Harten, 2006 g
 Ronisia Costa, 1858 g
 Schusterphotopsis Pitts, 2003 g
 Seriatospidia Nonveiller & Ćetković, 1996 g
 Sigilla Skorikov, 1927 g
 Sinotilla Lelej, 1995 g
 Skorikovia Ovtchinnikov, 2002 g
 Smicromutilla Mickel, 1964 g
 Smicromyrme Thomson, 1870 g
 Smicromyrmilla Suárez, 1965 g
 Sphaerophthalma Blake, 1886 g
 Sphaeropthalma Blake, 1871 g b
 Spinulomutilla Nonveiller, 1994 g
 Squamulotilla Bischoff, 1920 g
 Standfussidia Lelej, 2005 g
 Stenomutilla André, 1896 g
 Storozhenkotilla Lelej, 2005 g
 Taimyrmosa Lelej, 2005 g
 Taiwanomyrme Tsuneki, 1993 g
 Tallium André, 1902 g
 Timulla Ashmead, 1899 g b
 Tobantilla Casal, 1965 g
 Traumatomutilla André, 1901 g
 Tricholabiodes Radoszkowski, 1885 g
 Trogaspidia Ashmead, 1899 g
 Tropidotilla Bischoff, 1920 g
 Typhoctes Ashmead, 1899 g
 Vanhartenidia Lelejan Harten, 2006 g
 Zavatilla Tsuneki, 1993 g
 Zeugomutilla Chen, 1957 g

Data sources: i = ITIS, c = Catalogue of Life, g = GBIF, b = Bugguide.net

References